Bastarm-e Cheshmeh Anjir (also Romanized as Bastarm-e Cheshmeh Ānjīr and Besterom-e Cheshmehānjīr) is a village in Hana Rural District, Abadeh Tashk District, Neyriz County, Fars Province, Iran. At the 2006 census, its population was 216, in 50 families.

References 

Populated places in Abadeh Tashk County